"Hey There Delilah" is a song by American pop rock band Plain White T's. It was released on May 9, 2006 as an EP from their third studio album, All That We Needed (2005). The song was later released in 2007 as a single from their fourth studio album, Every Second Counts (2006), with added string instrumentation.

The song received radio play and became a sleeper hit, and eventually reaching No. 1 on the Billboard Hot 100 in July 2007. It was notably nominated at the 50th Grammy Awards in 2008 for Song of the Year and Best Pop Performance by a Duo or Group with Vocals.

Background and writing
The song was recorded and produced by Ariel Rechtshaid in North Hollywood, Los Angeles. The band's fourth album, Every Second Counts, has "Hey There Delilah" as a bonus track with a string section written and performed by Eric Remschneider augmenting the original recording.

The song was written by frontman Tom Higgenson after meeting Delilah DiCrescenzo, a nationally ranked American steeplechase and cross country runner, through a mutual friend around 2002.

Higgenson stated: "I thought she was the most beautiful girl I had ever seen, I told her, 'I have a song about you already.' Obviously, there was no song. But I thought it was smooth." DiCrescenzo turned him down, as she was dating somebody else at the time, but kept in touch with Higgenson. A year later, he had finished the song. About the actual writing, Higgenson said: "Because I wasn't with Delilah, I had to imagine, 'If I was with this girl, what would I want to tell her?'" In late 2004, Higgenson brought DiCrescenzo a disc with the finished song.

DiCrescenzo stated she found it difficult to deal with the popularity of a song written about her. "When I'm at the gym, it's playing; when I'm at the pool, it's playing. Part of me wants to scream at the top of my lungs that it's about me. Another part of me wants to cower and say it's not. [...] It was so beautifully written. There was pressure to live up to this ideal. I didn't know how to be polite but, you know, ditch him."

"Hey There Delilah" is written in the key of D major, with a tempo of 104 beats per minute in common time.

Release
Plain White T's released the song in May 2006 as the third single from their third studio album All That We Needed. In 2007, over one year after the song's release, it became the band's first hit in the United States, eventually reaching number one on the Billboard Hot 100 in July, marking the first Hot 100 No. 1 entry for Hollywood Records and Disney Music Group in the chart. From July 3 through July 28, 2007, it was the most played song on radio and the most downloaded song on the US iTunes Music Store.

It was Plain White T's first major hit. It also reached number two in the UK. The song ended 2007 as the year's 14th biggest-selling single in the UK.

Since its release, "Hey There Delilah" has been covered by many artists worldwide in one form or another. It has sold over 4,000,000 digital copies in the US alone.

Music video
The video was directed by Jay Martin.

It features the band's lead singer, Tom Higgenson, singing the song while the band members are in another room behind him. The other band members are not playing in the song. The only other instruments are the strings provided by Eric Remschneider, who does not appear in the video.

In a split-screen, it shows Delilah, played by model Melissa McNelis, who attends college in New York City. However, a fair amount of the scenes, if not all of them, used to depict the Delilah in New York were actually filmed in Chicago, the most prominent evidence can be found at 1:35 and 1:44 where Delilah boards what appears to be either a 2600 or a 3200-series Chicago "L" train. As well at 2:26 where the yellow cab in the background, while blurred, appears not to have the "NYC TAXI" decals that are found on the front doors of NYC yellow cabs.

Critical reception
Time magazine named "Hey There Delilah" one of The 10 Best Songs of 2007, ranking it number seven. Music critic Josh Tyrangiel called it "an intimate love song that's damn near universal"  Tyrangiel praised the Plain White T's for managing to make another "aching guy reaching out to distant girl song feel fresh", singling out singer Tom Higgenson's otherwise imperfect voice and "nasal delivery [for making] the nearly-comic sincerity of the lyrics seem completely genuine". AllMusic positively compared the song to "Thirteen" by Big Star.

The song was a double 2008 Grammy Award nominee, for Song of the Year (won by Amy Winehouse) and Best Pop Performance by a Duo or Group with Vocal (won by Maroon 5). DiCrescenzo attended the gala that year as the guest of Higgenson.

On VH1's Top 40 Videos of 2007, "Hey There Delilah" was number eight, ahead of "If Everyone Cared" by Nickelback and behind "Say It Right" by Nelly Furtado. VH1 had the song at number 78 on its list of the 100 Greatest Songs of the '00s.

The band was featured on Sesame Street in 2008 with the song "I'm the Letter T" (to the tune of "Hey There Delilah"). Higgenson provided the vocals for the computer animated letter T who sings the spoof. When asked if he was excited, Higgenson responded, "Yeah, hello! It's a dream. But it's just my voice. There's going to be some Muppet singing it on the screen."

Charts

Weekly charts

Year-end charts

Decade-end charts

Certifications

Release history

Other versions

In 2020, Jessica Ricca made a version called "Hey it's Delilah" from Delilah's perspective. As of June 2022 it has more than 9.9 million views on YouTube. Also in 2020, American Youtuber Melody Martin made a parody named "Hey Jason Botterill', in which she takes shots at the Buffalo Sabres former General Manager.  The song went viral on YouTube and had 304 thousand views as of 2022.  American rapper Rod Wave interpolated the song on his 2021 single "By Your Side".

Television series
In August 2018, it was announced by the band's frontman and songwriter, Tom Higgenson that Lively McCabe Entertainment and Primary Wave, along with writer Jeremy Desmon, would be teaming up to develop a potential series based on the band's hit song. Expanding on the story within the song, the series is described as being a romantic dramedy telling the contemporary fairy tale of a long-distance flirtation between a struggling singer-songwriter and a New York City university student. The songwriter pledges to write a song for the young woman on the night they meet, and that promise changes their lives in unexpected ways. The series will be pitched to potential networks and streaming services.

See also
List of Billboard Hot 100 number-one singles of 2007
List of Hot 100 number-one singles of 2007 (Canada)
List of number-one hits of 2007 (Germany)
List of European number-one hits of 2007

References

External links

2006 singles
Plain White T's songs
Billboard Hot 100 number-one singles
Canadian Hot 100 number-one singles
European Hot 100 Singles number-one singles
Number-one singles in Germany
Fearless Records singles
Hollywood Records singles
Song recordings produced by Ariel Rechtshaid
2005 songs
Folk ballads
Pop ballads
Rock ballads
2000s ballads
Emo pop songs